Joseph Enanga (born 28 August 1958 in Douala) is a Cameroonian football midfielder who played for Cameroon in the 1982 FIFA World Cup. He also played for Union Douala.

References

External links
FIFA profile

1956 births
Footballers from Douala
Cameroonian footballers
Cameroon international footballers
Association football midfielders
Union Douala players
1982 FIFA World Cup players
Living people